Genjeli is a village in the Chermik District of Diyarbakir Province in Turkey.

References

Villages in Çermik District